Rugby Football Club Haarlem is a Dutch rugby club in Haarlem.

History
The club was founded on 1 April 1980 when the clubs Kinheim, from Haarlem and HBC, from Heemstede joined forces.

External links
 RFC Haarlem

References

Dutch rugby union teams
Rugby clubs established in 1980
Sports clubs in Haarlem